is a monthly Japanese  manga magazine published by Shueisha on the third of each month. First issued in August 1955, its rivals are Nakayoshi and Ciao. Its target audience is girls roughly 8–14 years old.

It is one of the best-selling  manga magazines, having sold over 590million copies since 1978. Its circulation was in the millions between 1987 and 2001, peaking at 2.3million in 1994. In 2009, the magazine's circulation was 274,167. However, in 2010, the circulation dropped to 243,334.

Pages are printed on multicolored newsprint and issues are often more than 400 pages long. They are distributed with a sackful of goodies that range from small toys to colorful note pads themed around the manga serialized in the magazine. Readers can send in stamps for mail order gifts in some issues.

The manga series from this magazine are later compiled and published in book form under the Ribon Mascot Comics (RMC) imprint.

Ribon has also inspired multiple spin-off magazines, including Bessatsu Ribon (1966–1968); Ribon Comics, renamed Junior Comics (1967–1968); Ribon Comic (1968–1971); Ribon Deluxe (1975–1978); and Ribon Original (1981–2006).

Serializations

Current

 Animal Yokochō (2000–present)
 Onna no Ko tte. (2011–present)
 Honey Lemon Soda (2015–present)
 Not Your Idol (2018–present)

Past

1955–1979

 Arabesque (1971–1973)
 Himitsu no Akko-chan (1962–1965)
 Rumi-chan Kyōshitsu (1958)
 Sally the Witch (1966–1967)
 Shiroi Heya no Futari (1971)

1980–1989

 Tokimeki Tonight (1982–1994)
 Chibi Maruko-chan (1986–1996)
 Handsome na Kanojo (1988–1992)
 Whisper of the Heart (1989)

1990–1999

 Hime-chan's Ribbon (1990–1994)
 Tenshi Nanka Ja Nai (1991–1994)
 Akazukin Chacha (1991–2000)
 Marmalade Boy (1992–1995)
 Anata to Scandal (1993–1995)
 Kodomo no Omocha (1994–1998)
 Nurse Angel Ririka SOS (1995–1996)
 Neighborhood Story (1995–1998)
 Kero Kero Chime (1995–1998)
 Baby Love (1995–1999)
 I.O.N (1997)
 Mint na Bokura (1997–2000)
 Good Morning Call (1998–2002)
 Fancy Lala (1998)
 Kagen no Tsuki (1998–1999)
 Phantom Thief Jeanne (1998–2000)
 Gals! (1998–2002)
 St. Dragon Girl (1999–2003)

2000–2009

 Time Stranger Kyoko (2000–2001)
 Full Moon o Sagashite (2002–2004)
 Ultra Maniac (2002–2004)
 Aishiteruze Baby (2002–2005)
 St. Dragon Girl Miracle (2003–2005)
 ChocoMimi (2004–2019)
 Cactus's Secret (2004–2005)
 The Gentlemen's Alliance Cross (2004–2008)
 Love-Berrish! (2005–2007)
 Rockin' Heaven (2005–2008)
 Crash! (2007–2013)
 Chocolate Cosmos (2007–2008)
 Hello Kitty Doki (2007–2008)
 Hello Kitty Peace (2008)
 Mistress Fortune (2008)
 Momo: Welcome to the World-end Garden (2008–2011)
 Zekkyō Gakkyū (2008–2015)
 Sakura Hime: The Legend of Princess Sakura (2008–2012)
 Stardust Wink (2009–2012)
 Hiyokoi (2009–2014)

2010–2019
 Blue Friend (2010-2011)
 Pretty Rhythm (2010–2012)
 Nagareboshi Lens (2011–2014)
 Sugar Soldier (2011–2015)
 Rozen Maiden: Dolls Talk (2012–2014)
 Romantica Clock (2012–2016)
 ChocoTan! (2012–2017)
 Tsubasa to Hotaru (2013–2017)
 Little Witch Academia: Tsukiyo no Ōkan (2015)
 Acro Trip (2017–2022)
 Love Letters Written in June (2018)

Circulation

Notes

References

External links
  
 

1955 establishments in Japan
Monthly manga magazines published in Japan
Magazines established in 1955
Shōjo manga magazines
Shueisha magazines